The 2004 World Fencing Championships were held at the Hunter College in New York City, USA. The event took place on 11 June 2004. It had women's team foil and women's team sabre, both of which were not held at the 2004 Summer Olympics.

Medal summary

Medal table

See also 
 Fencing at the 2004 Summer Olympics

References
FIE Results

World Fencing Championships
World Fencing Championships
World Fencing Championships
Sports competitions in New York City
World Fencing Championships
International fencing competitions hosted by the United States
World Fencing Championships
International sports competitions in New York (state)
2000s in Manhattan